The Thrill of It All is a 1963 American romantic comedy film directed by Norman Jewison and starring Doris Day and James Garner, with a supporting cast featuring Carl Reiner, Arlene Francis, Reginald Owen and ZaSu Pitts. The screenplay was written by Carl Reiner from a story by Larry Gelbart.

Reiner had originally conceived the project for Judy Holliday, who developed cancer and had to bow out of the project, according to Reiner's reminiscence during his videotaped "Archive of American Television" interview.

Plot
The story centers around suburban housewife Beverly Boyer and her husband, a successful obstetrician and devoted family man, Gerald. Beverly is offered the opportunity to star in a television commercial advertising Happy Soap. After a shaky start, she gets a contract for nearly $80,000 per year (about $ in ) to appear in weekly TV commercials.

Soon the soap company places greater and greater demands on the unlikely TV star. Gerald resents the fact that the appearances are taking up an increasing amount of her time, and becomes jealous of the level of attention that her new-found stardom has brought her. Their relationship slowly deteriorates, and Gerald leaves her after unintentionally driving his 1958 Chevrolet convertible into the surprise swimming pool the soap company built where their garage used to be.  Gerald later returns, employing psychological warfare to make Beverly jealous by pretending that he is drinking and carousing with multiple women.  After a harrowing, bonding experience involving an expectant couple with whom they have become friendly, Beverly decides to give up her lucrative career and return to her "philandering" husband and her life as a housewife and mother.

Cast
 Doris Day as Beverly Boyer
 James Garner as Dr. Gerald Boyer
 Arlene Francis as Mrs. Fraleigh
 Edward Andrews as Gardiner Fraleigh
 Reginald Owen as Old Tom Fraleigh
 ZaSu Pitts as Olivia
 Elliott Reid as Mike Palmer
 Alice Pearce as Irving's Wife
 Kym Karath as Maggie Boyer
 Brian Nash as Andy Boyer
 Lucy Landau as Mrs. Goethe
 Paul Hartman as Dr. Taylor
 Burt Mustin as the Fraleighs' butler

Carl Reiner, one of the two screenwriters of the film, makes brief appearances as a character actor appearing on TV in various nasty roles (World War II German Officer / Cad / Western Gunslinger).

Production
The film was announced in 1962. Hunter wanted to reunite Nelson Eddy and Jeanette MacDonald by having them play support parts.

Doris Day and James Garner played the leads as a married couple in another theatrical film later that same year titled Move Over, Darling, a remake of the Irene Dunne/Cary Grant movie My Favorite Wife (1940). The Thrill of It All and Move Over, Darling were almost equally huge box office hits, with the first film released in July and the second opening on Christmas Day.

Reception
The Thrill of It All was the 16th biggest hit of the year, grossing $11,779,093 domestically. It earned $6 million in US theatrical rentals.

Garner wrote the film was "better than it should have been... because of Doris."

See also
List of American films of 1963

References

External links
 
 
 
 
 The Thrill of It All at Trailers from Hell

1963 films
1963 romantic comedy films
American romantic comedy films
Films about advertising
Films about television
Films directed by Norman Jewison
Films produced by Ross Hunter
Films scored by Frank De Vol
Films set in New York (state)
Films with screenplays by Carl Reiner
Universal Pictures films
1960s English-language films
1960s American films